The Museum of Multiethnic Musical Instruments "Fausto Cannone" is dedicated to music and is located inside the Ex Church of Saint James of the Sword at 75, Via Commendatore Navarra (near the Castle of the Counts of Modica) in Alcamo, Italy.

History 
With the deliberation n° 116 of 23 November 2012, the Town Council of Alcamo, approved the steering motion, with the Councillor professor Antonio Fundarò as the first signatory and proposer, named "Institution Museum of Music Fausto Cannone".

On 23 January 2014 the Municipal Administration approved the deliberation relating to the foundation of the "Museum of the Multiethnic Musical Instruments", later inaugurated in July of the same year.

Initially the museum was set in two rooms of the Museum of Contemporary Art of Alcamo inside the Ex Collegio dei Gesuiti, in Piazza Ciullo, at last, in June 2018 the museum has its final seat in the premises of the ex church San Giacomo della Spada.
 
The museum was born thanks to the perseverance of Fausto Cannone (a teacher, poet and singer-songwriter):  thanks to his generous donation, they could realize in Alcamo the first ethnical musical Museum existing in Sicily.

On 25 May 2021, the Municipal Administration has assigned the delivery of works relating to the project of extraordinary maintenance of the ex church San Giacomo della Spada, which foresees the correct conservation of the collection of the instruments belonged to Maestro Fausto Cannone.

The project has been financed by GAL Gulf di Castellammare, PSR Sicilia 2014–2020.

At last the museum is going to have the suitable setting for the touristic-cultural fruition and the performing of recreational activities for citizens and visitors; in this way, they are going to resume the old ideal of the historical hospice inside this church, representing a place and an obligatory point of passage for the pilgrims who wanted to reach Santiago de Compostela.

Fausto Cannone 
The museum was opened thanks to Fausto Cannone's perseverance and desire of this artist to leave a sign of love to his town:
Cannone, who died last September, went round the world for 30 years: he got the most strange and original musical instruments, string and wind ones, which are all working and bought in their original countries. At last, this exceptional patrimony, maybe unique in its genre, has its final seat.

Fausto Cannone had received several requests, even by the Palazzo Steri from Palermo, but he preferred to donate these precious instruments to his hometown. He wanted to dedicate this museum to his father Gaspare Cannone who was a journalist, literary critic, anarchist and antifascist: He lived in the United States for many years, but due to his stands in favour of Sacco and Vanzetti, he was arrested and then forced to get back to Italy.

Description and instruments 
The museum hosts 202 instruments coming from Thailand to Tibet, from New Guinea al South America, from Polynesia to China, from Australia to Argentina, from South Africa to several European countries. Most of them are poor instruments, made with parts of plants and animals, but there are also valuable craft products.

Among the instruments you can see at the museum there are: flutes, cymbals, drums, bagpipes, accordions, trumpets, violins, guitars, mandolins, harmonicas.

Here is the list:
crotalok: a three strings instrument from Mauritius, in the Indian Ocean; it is the first of the collection.
xylophone: played in the buddhist monasteries during their services; the frame is carved in a single block of ebony, representing three dragons, with small tablets of various length.
Bolivian charango: a very rare instrument obtained from the skin of the armadillo, a threatened species today. 
Italian violin dating back to 1714. 
didjaridn: aerophone with a single hole, given to Fausto Cannone by the head of a tribe of Aboriginal Tasmanians, south-east of Australia. 
, Algeria: bowed string instrument from Afghanistan, and spread by Arabs in North Africa and Mediterranean countries.
sarinda, stringed instrument of folk music from India or Nepal; similar to a lute and violin; it is played with a bow
gansira
swarpeti: wooden instrument, working on a system of foldings, similar to a pump organ
bansuri, Indian flute
takita
marambao
vojnica 
iakir
sitar 
bouzuki: Greek or Irish stringed instrument 
rombadao
guzla: a musical instrument of Serbian and Croatian peoples, similar to a violin, with a curved sound box and a single string derived from horsehair.
shamir
banjo 
sanzas (Camerun):  metal or bamboo musical keyboard, with a sound box. 
lute pì pà: Chinese instrument with 4 strings.
flute from the Amazon basin 
balalaika from Russia

Nanga (Congo or Uganda): with a wooden oval box, wholly closed with skin and with a solid handle inserted, with a side series of tuning pegs which serve to stretch the strings made of guts or fibers.
On the nanga they sing and recite slow melodies praising the leaders’ feats 
Qanun, Egypt: instrument with 78 strings,  similar to a trapezoidal citara
Kornai, Turkestan 
Saran, India
Pipa, China: instrument with 4 strings belonging to the family of lutes
Yùeh ch’in (China): one of the main types of lutes with a short Chinese handle, with a circular box.
T'ang-ku (China) 
Zheng (China) 
Gender or metallophone, Indonesia. 
Berimbau or urmwngo (Brasil): a string musical instrument from Africa, which was spread in Brasil after the importation of African slaves during colonialism. Today it is part of the tradition of music of Latin America; it is made up of a wooden bow which stretches a metal string. A dry and hollow pumpkin operates like a sound box. Two models 
Zither, Austria; string instrument: its strings are stretched over a resonator like in the psaltery. Two models
Kantele, Finland; instrument with 5 strings, linked by a wooden handle dug to the body and opened in the lower part.
Gusle, (ex-Jugoslavia): popular instrument with a single string used in Balkans, deriving from the byzantine lyra.

See also 
 List of music museums
 Museum of Contemporary Art of Alcamo
 Ex collegio dei Gesuiti

References

Sources 
https://www.accordo.it/article/viewPub/82943
http://www.trapaniok.it/7613/Cultura-trapani/il-museo-degli-strumenti-musicali-multietnici-fausto-cannone-di-alcamo-e-la-poliedricita-del-musicista-del-cantautore-del-poeta-del-collezionista-di-emozioni-e-sentimenti#.V9gZJ62s9Z8
Facebook page
http://www.bancadonrizzo.it/pdf/rivista2.pdf
Funso S. Afọlayan, Culture and Customs of South Africa, Greenwood Publishing Group, 2004, .

External links 

 
List of instruments
https://web.archive.org/web/20180618214803/http://www.comune.alcamo.tp.it/attachments/article/1144/19-14%20Allegato2.pdf

Museums in Alcamo
Musical instrument museums
Buildings and structures in Sicily
Music organisations based in Italy